Justin Pemberton is a documentary filmmaker based in New Zealand.

Life and career

Pemberton's adaptation of economist Thomas Piketty’s NY Times bestseller Capital in the Twenty-First Century premièred at the 2019 Sydney Film Festival and expanded to a worldwide release in 2020. The film is 'Certified Fresh' by Rotten Tomatoes with a 93% score.

In 2016 Pemberton co-wrote and directed a film about rugby player Richie McCaw called Chasing Great, which topped the New Zealand box office with a record-breaking opening weekend  and went on to become the highest grossing New Zealand documentary of all time.

His 2016 interactive documentary I Spy (with My 5 Eyes) investigated the Five Eyes Intelligence sharing network. The documentary was narrated by Lucy Lawless and produced by Carthew Neal. I Spy (with My 5 Eyes) was nominated for a 2018 Canadian Screen Award for Best Original Interactive Production.

Pemberton was Executive Producer on the 2016 David Farrier documentary Tickled.

In 2012 Pemberton wrote and directed the feature docudrama The Golden Hour, based on the story of New Zealand athletes Peter Snell and Murray Halberg at the 1960 Summer Olympics in Rome. The Golden Hour was nominated for a 2013 International Emmy Award for best documentary.

His film The Nuclear Comeback investigated the nuclear power industry’s claim that, as a low carbon emitter, nuclear power is climate-friendly source of energy. The documentary won Best Documentary at Italy’s CinemAmbiente Film Festival in 2008  and Best New Zealand Feature Documentary at the DocNZ Film Festival. Pemberton was also awarded Achievement in Directing (Documentary) at the 2008 Qantas Film and Television Awards for The Nuclear Comeback.

Pemberton’s film Love, Speed and Loss, about Grand Prix road-racer Kim Newcombe, won Best Documentary, Best Editing and Best Directing at the 2007 New Zealand Screen Awards and was awarded Best Arts/Festival Documentary at the 2007 Qantas Television Awards.

He has frequently collaborated with queer New Zealand musician Anika Moa, directing two documentaries following the singer as well as music videos and photo shoots, including the cover of her 2010 album Love In Motion. Moa has also composed the soundtracks for five of Pemberton’s films.

Festivals and awards
Love Speed and Loss
 2007 NZ Screen Awards: Win, Best Documentary, 
 2007 NZ Screen Awards: Win, Achievement in Directing
 2007 NZ TV Awards: Win, Best Arts/Festival Documentary 
 2005 New Zealand International Film Festivals
 2006 Reel Life On Film, Melbourne, Australia
The Nuclear Comeback
 2008 NZ Film & TV Awards: Win, Achievement in Directing
 2008 Cinemambiente, Italy: Win, Best Documentary
 2007 Documentary Edge Awards: Win, Best NZ Feature
 2008 Göteborg International Film Festival, Sweden
 2008 Rodos Film Festival, Greece: Runner-up, Medium Length Feature
 2008 South African International Documentary Film Festival
 2008 Festival Internacional de Cine Documentary, Mexico
 2008 Globale Berlin Film Festival, Germany
 2009 Cinema Planeta, Mexico
 2009 One World Film Festival, Prague, Czech Republic
The Golden Hour
2013 International Emmy Awards: Nomination, Best Documentary
Chasing Great
 2017 New Zealand Film Awards: Nomination, Best Documentary, Best Documentary Director
I Spy (With My 5 Eyes)
2018 Canadian Screen Awards: Nomination, Best Original Interactive Production
2018 Cleveland International Film Festival, USA
2017 Festival International de Programmes Audiovisuels, France
Capital In The Twenty-First Century
 2019 Sydney Film Festival
 2019 New Zealand International Film Festival
 2019 Melbourne International Film Festival 
 2019 Jerusalem Film Festival 
 2019 Filmfest Hamburg 
 2019 Doc NYC
 2020 CPH:DOX
 2020 Edinburgh International Film Festival
 2020 Docs Against Gravity Film Festival, Poland
 2020 DOCVILLE International Documentary Film Festival, Belgium
 2020 Festival Varilux de Cinema Francês, Brazil
 2020 Ji.hlava International Documentary Film Festival, Czech Republic
 2021 Mostra Ecofalante de Cinema, Brazil

References

External links
 
 NZ On Screen

New Zealand documentary filmmakers
Living people
Year of birth missing (living people)